Norbert Esnault (6 June 1928 – 21 April 2016) was a French racing cyclist. He rode in the 1953 Tour de France.

References

1928 births
2016 deaths
French male cyclists
Place of birth missing